The second season of The Voice of the Philippines was a reality singing competition in ABS-CBN which started airing on October 26, 2014. apl.de.ap, Lea Salonga, Sarah Geronimo, and Bamboo Mañalac returned as coaches for this season. Toni Gonzaga also returned to host the show; she was also joined by The Voice Kids host, Luis Manzano. Robi Domingo and Alex Gonzaga also returned to reprise their roles as the show's V-reporters.

The show aired every Saturdays 8:45 p.m. (PST) and Sundays at 8:30 p.m. (PST).

On March 1, 2015, Jason Dy of Team Sarah won the competition, beating Alisah Bonaobra of Team apl.

Development

Coaches and hosts

Sarah Geronimo confirmed that she had a hard time working as a coach during the first season, but she confirmed that she was still willing to work as a coach for the second season. On December 16, 2013, it was announced that Geronimo signed an exclusive contract with ABS-CBN for two years. Part of her contract was her stint as a coach for the second season. Lea Salonga also expressed that she wanted to return as a coach for the second season. However, depended on her schedule. "I want to do it again. I would be defending. I kind of would love to stay but then there are external forces that are no longer in my control. There's my schedule, there's a call of Broadway and there's a call of other things. It was magical the first season because all of the stars aligned perfectly," said Salonga. On January 15, 2014 interview by Push, Salonga confirmed her return as coach in the show. "The Voice is coming back. I mean first it's okay to announce it, I have not been given the go ahead yet to say anything yet but I am certainly coming back so my chair is going to turning again for people so I am excited," she said. Salonga also confirmed that there were rumors that apl.de.ap will not return to the show. She commented, "As for Season 2, I have no idea what the plans are for Apl if he is going to return, I hope he does because over the first season the four of us have developed a really nice rapport and banter and chemistry and it would be nice to pick up where we left off rather than start over but those things are not up to me. So I am only hoping that he returns for Season 2 if he doesn't we hope we find somebody who will be able to fit the chair and be able to keep up with us because the three of us are on, it is so on, it is just the trash talking begins." It was noted that near the end of the first season, apl.de.ap along with Bamboo Mañalac had expressed their intentions to return for the second season. On March 20, 2014, the Sun Star Manila confirmed the return of all coaches for the second season. On June 12, 2014 interview by MJ Filipe of ABS-CBN News, apl confirmed his return for the second season.

Toni Gonzaga also returned as the host. On April 15, 2014, Domingo confirmed his return for the second season. By September of the same year, Alex Gonzaga was confirmed to return while Luis Manzano was added as T. Gonzaga's co-host.

Prizes
The winner of the second season of the franchise won a trophy designed by Leeroy New, a house and lot worth 2 million pesos from Camella Homes, a business package from Brother Philippines worth 1 million pesos, a shopping spree and an Asian tour package for two from Jag worth 350 thousand pesos, a brand new Ford Fiesta, a musical instrument package worth 100 thousand pesos, an MCA Universal recording contract, and 2 million pesos from Systema Toothpaste.

Broadcast
An air date of November 15, 2014 was first reported by Salonga; however, it was pushed to October 26, 2014, three weeks earlier than the initial air date. Its first two episodes aired only on Sundays. Starting on November 8, the show aired every Saturdays and Sundays — completely occupying the weekend time slots of I Do.

Auditions

The show was renewed for a second season after it garnered immense popularity and high television ratings. ABS-CBN later announced that auditions for January 2014 for the Luzon, Metro Manila, Visayas, and Mindanao regions together with the auditions for the first season of The Voice Kids. Online auditions were slated for summer 2014, but were pushed to June 2014.

Teams
Color key

Blind auditions

Lea Salonga wrote in the Philippine Daily Inquirer that blind auditions were t be filmed by June, but they were moved to September 7 to 10 of the same year. At the end of the blind auditions, each team had 14 artists.

A week prior to the start of the first episode, several teasers were aired. Two were blind auditions teasers wherein two female contestants sang their respective audition piece.

The blind auditions first aired on October 26, 2014. and ended on November 30, 2014 after 10 episodes.

Color key

Episode 1 (October 26)
The first episode had an opening performance of the coaches. Sarah Geronimo and Lea Salonga sang "Run the World" by Beyoncé, and were followed by Bamboo Mañalac and apl.de.ap who sang "Ten Feet Tall" by Afrojack. All then performed a mash-up of the two songs.

Episode 2 (November 2)

Episode 3 (November 8)

Episode 4 (November 9)

Episode 5 (November 15)

Episode 6 (November 16)

Episode 7 (November 22)

Episode 8 (November 23)

Episode 9 (November 29)

Episode 10 (November 30)

The Battles

The power to steal an artist from the other teams was implemented during this season. At the end of the Battles, each coach had nine artists who advanced to the Knockouts, two of whom were stolen artists from the other teams.

The Battles opened with Lea Salonga and Bamboo Mañalac singing Stevie Wonder's "Someday at Christmas", followed by Sarah Geronimo and apl.de.ap singing Mariah Carey's "All I Want for Christmas Is You." The coaches sang ABS-CBN's Christmas Station ID's "Ang Babait Ninyo" together, originally sung by The Voice Kids top four finalists.

The first episode of the Battles aired on December 6, 2014, and the sixth and last episode aired on December 21, 2014.

Color key

The Knockouts
The Knockouts was added along with steals. Each artist had to sing and convince his/her coach in order to pick him/her up for the final line-up for the Live shows. Each team was divided into three groups of three artists, and each artist decided which song to sing. In each group, two advanced to the Live shows with the remaining one eliminated from competition.

At the end of this round, from the nine artists per team, only six artists advanced to the Live shows.

Color key

Note

^  Joniver Robles was able to advance to the Live shows after being picked by Bamboo during the Knockouts; Rita Martinez was eliminated. However, after the episode, Bamboo announced that Robles had to leave the competition due to personal reasons. From the guidelines placed by Talpa, if an artist withdrew from the competition, the person he had last battled replaced him; in this case, the last artist Robles battled was Martinez, who was reinstated and went to the Live shows.

Live shows
The Live Shows aired on January 24, 2015 at the Newport Performing Arts Theater, a theater with a capacity of 1,500 at Resorts World Manila in Newport City, Pasay, Metro Manila. It was the second time that this stage of the competition was held there. Differentiating from the first season, the live shows were aired Saturdays and Sundays; the former was for the performance night, the latter for the results night.

The voting system was similar to the semifinals of the previous season wherein the public voted for the artist they wanted to save per team. Voting commenced after all the artists had performed and closed the following night. The accumulated public votes from the public determined the first artist to advance from each team, and their respective coaches chose the second.

For the third and fourth Live show weeks, a new voting format was formed. Each night was a performance and results night. Two teams had to perform per night. After each team had performed, the voting lines were opened and closed immediately after the commercial break. Before the night ended, one artist per team was eliminated. By the fifth week, the use of points was reinstated; half of which were from the public and half from the artist's coach. Coaches were barred from giving equal points to their respective artists.

The finale was on March 1, 2015.

Color key

Week 1 (January 24 & 25) 

Notes:

Week 2 (January 31 & February 1) 
After the announcement of the results of the public votes, apl.de.ap along with Abra, Loonie, Jessica Reynoso of season 1, and some artists made a tribute to the 44 members of the Philippine National Police–Special Action Force who died in a clash with members of the Moro Islamic Liberation Front and Bangsamoro Islamic Freedom Fighters. 

Notes:

Week 3 (February 7 & 8) 

Notes:

Week 4 

Notes:

Week 5: Semifinals (February 21 & 22)

Week 6: Finals (February 28 & March 1) 
As in the previous season, the finale was aired in a two part episode. However, deviating from previous Live shows, the "1 sim equals 1 vote" rule was implemented. There were four sets of performances per artist in the first round. The results of the votes were then revealed on the second episode of the finals, where the final two artists had to perform in a final showdown. After the two top artists were revealed, the scores were reset to zero. The voting lines were then reopened for the final two, wherein the artist with the highest vote totals was the winner of the competition. The finals were held in the Newport Performing Arts Theater, Resorts World Manila, Pasay.

Color key

First round

Second round

Elimination Chart

Results summary 

 Color key
 Artist's info

 Result details

Teams 

 Artist's info

 Result details

Artists who appeared on other talent shows
Eliminated in the Blind auditions
 Musica Cristobal appeared in Star for a Night on IBC. She was a grand finalist alongside coach Sarah Geronimo.
 Isaiah Antonio auditioned for Kanta Pilipinas on TV5, he made to the top 24 auditionees but failed to make it to the top 12 finalists.
 Jerrica Santos competed on the second season of Canadian Idol, but was eliminated in the semifinals.

Eliminated in the Battles
 Rosalyn Navarro appeared in Protégé: The Battle For The Big Break on GMA Network and finished in tenth place.
 Karl Tanhueco was the winner of the third season of PAGCOR Talent Search organized by the Philippine Amusement and Gaming Corporation (PAGCOR).
 Thara Jordana appeared as one of the finalists in Kanta Pilipinas on TV5 and made it to the finals.
Samantha Felizco appeared in Protégé: The Battle For The Big Break on GMA Network. She placed ninth in the said competition.

Eliminated in the Knockouts
 Jem Cubil appeared in the second season of Pilipinas Got Talent on ABS-CBN. He reached the grand finals and finished eleventh place out of the twelve finalists.
 Carol Leus won TFC Pop Star Search in Dubai, which was organized by The Filipino Channel in 2004. In 2008, she also appeared in Pinoy Idol on GMA Network. She was one of the top twenty-four semifinalists, but failed to advance as one of the top twelve finalists.

Advanced to the Live shows
 Ferns Tosco and Timmy Pavino appeared as finalists in Kanta Pilipinas on TV5. They were eliminated on the third week of the competition.
 Casper Blancaflor participated in the Asia New Singer Competition in 2008 and won a silver award.
 Daryl Ong appeared in the first season of Pinoy Pop Superstar aired on GMA Network but failed to advance to the finals.
 Originally auditioned as a solo artist for the first season of The X Factor Philippines on ABS-CBN, Monique Lualhati became part of A.K.A. Jam, an all-girl group created by the mentor-judges of the said singing competition. They reached the Live show stage, but was eliminated by the third week and came in tenth place.
 Leah Patricio appeared in the first season of Talentadong Pinoy on TV5. She was one of the grand finalists.

Reception

Controversies

Spoiler issue
Several users from Facebook and Twitter were blocked by the social management team of the show after several spoilers of The Battles' winners were posted online. This incident made Salonga furious and disappointed.

Joniver Robles' departure from the show
After the last episode of the Knockouts that aired last January 19, Mañalac announced that Joniver Robles was replaced by Rita Martinez after the former decided to withdraw from the show due to personal reasons. However, in a post of Robles via his Facebook account, he stressed that he never knew about his status until he saw the episode. Due to this, lots of speculation arose online regarding Robles' removal from the show. Salonga was asked about the issue but decided to not comment. She further stated that she was not the proper person to be asked since it was not her team that was involved.

Television ratings
Television ratings for the second season of The Voice of the Philippines on ABS-CBN were gathered from two major sources – AGB Nielsen and Kantar Media. AGB Nielsen's survey ratings were gathered from Mega Manila households, while Kantar Media's survey ratings were gathered from urban and rural households all over the Philippines.

Based from the data gathered by Kantar Media, the second season was the sixth most watched show in February 2015, garnering an average viewership of 24.4%.

References

External links
 The Voice of the Philippines (season 2) on ABS-CBN

The Voice of the Philippines
2014 Philippine television seasons
2015 Philippine television seasons